Group Captain Subramanyan Chennakeshu (born November 1925) is a retired officer of the Indian Air Force. He joined the Indian Air Force in 1947 as an Engineer Officer.  In 1960 he was deputed to serve as a prototype production engineer at Hindustan Aeronautics Limited (H.A.L). He was an integral part of the team that built the H.F-24 Marut, the first fighter jet developed in India. On 26 January 1964, he was awarded the Vishisht Seva Medal for his service and contribution. After retiring from the Air Force in 1969, he joined H.A.L. as a production engineer and went on to become managing director.

References 

1925 births
Possibly living people
Indian Air Force officers
Indian military personnel
Recipients of the Vishisht Seva Medal